An agricultural show is a public event exhibiting the equipment, animals, sports and recreation associated with agriculture and animal husbandry. The largest comprise a livestock show (a judged event or display in which breeding stock is exhibited), a trade fair, competitions, and entertainment. The work and practices of farmers, animal fanciers, cowboys, and zoologists may be displayed. The terms agricultural show and livestock show are synonymous with the North American terms county fair and state fair.

History

The first known agricultural show was held by Salford Agricultural Society, Lancashire, in 1768.

Events

Since the 19th century, agricultural shows have provided local people with an opportunity to celebrate achievements and enjoy a break from day-to-day routine. With a combination of serious competition and light entertainment, annual shows acknowledged and rewarded the hard work and skill of primary producers and provided a venue for rural families to socialise. City shows also provide city people with an opportunity to engage directly with rural life and food production.

Agriculture shows are often enlivened with competitive events, including sheaf tossing, show jumping, food competitions, and tent pegging. Demolition derbies and rodeos are popular in the US and campdrafting and wood chopping are often held in Australia.

Studs are generally available for a fee.

Livestock shows

A livestock show is an event where livestock are exhibited and judged on certain phenotypical breed traits as specified by their respective breed standard. Species of livestock that may be shown include pigs, cattle, sheep, goats, horses, rabbits, llamas, and alpacas. Poultry such as chickens, geese, ducks, turkeys, and pigeons are also shown competitively. There are also competitive shows for dogs, sheepdogs, and cats.

Prize-winners at agricultural shows are generally awarded inscribed medals, cups, rosettes or ribbons. The National Museum of Australia has a rare collection of medals documenting the history of agricultural shows and rural industries across Australia. The 111 medals range in date from the mid-19th to the early 20th century and many are associated with significant individuals and organizations.

Agricultural shows and swine influenza

Background
Agricultural shows can be sources of swine influenza transmission in both animal and human populations. Swine influenza is a communicable disease caused by one of several different strains of influenza A virus. Currently, the subtypes of influenza A virus which have been identified in pig populations within the United States are referred to as H1N1, H1N2, and H3N2, all named for their specific genetic makeups. These viruses are extremely common in pigs across various industries, including pig showmanship at agricultural fairs, and are easily passed between pigs when proper hygiene and safety measures are not carried out.

It is rare for the virus to spread to humans; however, genetic reassortment can lead to susceptibility among humans. Due to direct contact with infected animals or a contaminated environment, swine influenza strains can be transmitted to human populations. In cases such as the 2009 flu pandemic, the virus was transmitted from swine to humans and caused a global pandemic which led to the deaths of approximately 12,000 people in the United States alone. For this reason, people who work or spend any time in close proximity with pigs are at risk for infection and must follow specific precautions to prevent the spread of swine influenza.

Swine influenza risk
Certain populations at agricultural fairs are at increased risk of developing serious complications after swine influenza exposure. For instance, pregnant women are more susceptible to swine influenza and have been shown to have increased rates of swine influenza mortality relative to the general population. Similarly, adolescents, infants, and those with serious medical comorbid conditions have disproportionately high rates of mortality with swine influenza. This is concerning as over 3.5 million children in the United States participate in youth agricultural programs every year.

Agricultural fairs can readily lead to swine influenza infection in vulnerable populations because agricultural fairs are frequently visited by entire families, including children and pregnant women.

Recent swine flu variant outbreaks in the United States

Swine influenza variant viruses have been responsible for several recent outbreaks in the United States associated with contact with pigs at agricultural fairs. The three main Influenza A viruses responsible for these outbreaks are variants of the Influenza A viruses H1N1, H1N2, and H3N2.

Recent swine influenza variant outbreaks associated with agriculture fairs in the United States:
2009: global spread of H1N1, starting from the United States in April 2009. On 11 June 2009 the World Health Organization issued an imminent pandemic alert. At this time, 70 countries reported ongoing outbreaks, and over 1 million ongoing cases were documented in the United States alone. H1N1 is now a regularly occurring human influenza virus that continues to circulate seasonally and globally with the other influenza viruses.
2012: 306 confirmed cases identified of H3N2 in 10 different states. Over 80% of cases were found in Ohio and Indiana. Human-to-human transmission is thought to have caused 15 cases, but the rest all reported direct or indirect contact with swine, mostly at agricultural fairs. (See image) 
2016: 18 confirmed cases in Ohio and Michigan between July and August 2016. All cases reported pig exposure at least one of seven agricultural fairs between the two states.
2017: 40 confirmed cases of H3N2 occurred in Maryland after swine exposure at one of three agricultural fairs. 35 of the cases occurred in people in the high-risk category for influenza complications.

Preventing the spread of flu in people and pigs

In the United States, agricultural fairs are a significant exposure source for swine influenza. Certain strains of swine influenza can be transmitted from pig to pig, pig to human, human to human; swine influenza infection does not always show signs of illness.

There are a variety of safety precautions that should be taken at agricultural fairs to prevent the spread of swine influenza. Vulnerable communities including children, people aged 65 years and older, pregnant women, and those suffering from long-term health conditions are groups who should avoid swine exposure due to their high-risk status. The CDC specifically recommends that high-risk individuals with known medical complications avoid interaction with swine at agricultural fairs. It is advised that anyone who develops flu symptoms after swine exposure at agricultural fairs contact their physician for appropriate medical consultation.

There are other recommended prevention strategies to reduce the spread of swine influenza at agricultural fairs. It is suggested that people do not bring food into pig areas, do not take any items such as toys, pacifiers or similar items near the pig areas, avoid close contact with any pigs, and wash hands before and after handling pigs. Given the severity of the disease, it is prudent to adopt safety precautions to limit the spread of the swine flu.

Field days
Related to a show is the "field day", with elements of a trade show for machinery, equipment and skills required for broadacre farming. Field days typically do not involve livestock, showbags or sideshows, but may include events such as ploughing competitions not usually associated with shows due to the larger space required. In some communities in northern England Field Days (or Club Days) have lost their agricultural character and have become community celebrations.

The events are good sources of agricultural information, as organizers can arrange for guest speakers to talk on a range of topics, such as the talk on the yellow-flowering alfalfa at the South Dakota field day. Pecan growers were given a talk on insect control by an entomologist at a recent field day at LSU AgCenter's Pecan Research/Extension Station in Shreveport, La.

A Landcare survey conducted in 1992/93 revealed that field days in Australia have a high value among local farmers. New Zealand's National Agricultural Fieldays is held annually in June at Mystery Creek, near Hamilton, New Zealand, and attracts 1,000 exhibitors and over 115,000 visitors through its gates. Smaller shows, held annually in New Zealand's towns and communities, are generally called agricultural and pastoral shows (A&P shows).

List of agricultural shows

Asia

Saudi Arabia
Mazayen al-Ibl

South America

Argentina
La Rural - Buenos Aires

Brazil

Expointer - Esteio

Oceania

New Zealand

 Canterbury A&P Show - Christchurch
 Fieldays - Hamilton
 National Agricultural Fieldays
 Royal New Zealand Show

Australia

Incomplete list of shows in Australia:

North America

Canada 

Ayer's Cliff Fair - Ayer's Cliff, Quebec
Brome Fair - Brome, Quebec
Calgary Stampede - Calgary, Alberta
Canadian National Exhibition - Toronto, Ontario
Canadian Western Agribition  - Regina, Saskatchewan
Farm Fair - Prince Albert, Saskatchewan
Grande Prairie Stompede - Grande Prairie, Alberta
Hants County Exhibition - Windsor, Nova Scotia
Royal Agricultural Winter Fair - Toronto, Ontario
Royal Manitoba Winter Fair - Brandon, Manitoba
Schomberg Fair - Schomberg, Ontario

Jamaica
Denbigh Agricultural Show : The Denbigh Show is the oldest, largest and most dynamic agricultural show in the English-speaking Caribbean, and one of Jamaica's most iconic events, and was held for the first time in 1952. The Denbigh Show has achieved the name for the Caribbean's premier agricultural event, and epitomizes wholesome family entertainment and attracts over 80,000 patrons to the event annually.

Puerto Rico
Cinco Días con Nuestra Tierra - Mayagüez

United States

Africa

South Africa
 Bathurst Agricultural Show - Bathurst
Rand Easter Show - Johannesburg
 The Royal Agricultural Show www.royalshow.co.za - Pietermaritzburg
 Nampo  - Bothaville
Nairobi international trade fair
[Nairobi]

Europe

Norway
Dyrskun  - Seljord, Norway

France
Paris International Agricultural Show - Paris, France
Salon international du machinisme agricole - Paris, France
Salon du fromage et des produits laitiers - Paris, France

Spain
F.I.M.A. International Fair of Agricultural Machinery - Zaragoza, Spain

Ireland

National Ploughing Championships - various sites, Ireland
Ballinasloe Horse Fair
Banagher Horse Fair
Clifden Show
Tullamore Show

United Kingdom

See also
 Agritourism
 Lakeland Shows
 State fair
 Trade fair

References

 
Trade fairs
Fair